Kaingaroa is a locality in the Far North District of New Zealand. It lies on State Highway 10 north-east of Awanui and Kaitaia, and south-west of Karikari Peninsula.

Demographics
The SA1 area is part of the larger Karikari Peninsula statistical area.

The SA1 statistical area had a population of 183 at the 2018 New Zealand census, a decrease of 6 people (−3.2%) since the 2013 census, and an increase of 24 people (15.1%) since the 2006 census. There were 63 households, comprising 93 males and 90 females, giving a sex ratio of 1.03 males per female. The median age was 50.3 years (compared with 37.4 years nationally), with 36 people (19.7%) aged under 15 years, 21 (11.5%) aged 15 to 29, 99 (54.1%) aged 30 to 64, and 27 (14.8%) aged 65 or older.

Ethnicities were 86.9% European/Pākehā, 27.9% Māori, 1.6% Pacific peoples, and 1.6% other ethnicities. People may identify with more than one ethnicity.

Of those people who chose to answer the census's question about religious affiliation, 55.7% had no religion, 34.4% were Christian, 1.6% had Māori religious beliefs and 3.3% had other religions.

Of those at least 15 years old, 15 (10.2%) people had a bachelor or higher degree, and 27 (18.4%) people had no formal qualifications. The median income was $26,600, compared with $31,800 nationally. 15 people (10.2%) earned over $70,000 compared to 17.2% nationally. The employment status of those at least 15 was that 75 (51.0%) people were employed full-time, 27 (18.4%) were part-time, and 6 (4.1%) were unemployed.

Education

Notes

Far North District
Populated places in the Northland Region